Thomas Dreier (May 5, 1884 – September 4, 1976) was an American editor, writer, advertising executive, and business theorist. The Thomas Dreier Reading Room at Peter H. Armacost Library, Eckerd College is named in his honor.

He subsequently moved to the Boston area. He built the Frank Chouteau Brown-designed "Snug Gables" in Winchester, Massachusetts, where he lived from 1920 to 1933, and later settled in New Hampshire on a  farm named "Sunny Meadows" in Melvin Village, Tuftonborough.

In 1935 he and his first wife, Blanche Nowell Dreier, moved to St. Petersburg, Florida. In Florida Thomas served as chairman of the State Library Board and was a leader in rebuilding the St. Petersburg Public Library. Blanche died in 1960 and in 1961 he married Mary Baker.

He was the first editor of the New Hampshire Troubadour magazine.

Selected works

 Heroes of Insurgency (1910)
 The Story of Three Partners; United Shoe Machinery Company, Beverly, Mass. (1911)
 Silver Lining or Sunshine on the Business Trail (1922)
 Sunny Meadows (1933), concerning he and Blanche's life on their farm in New Hampshire
 The Power of Print—and Men (1936), with William Addison Dwiggins
 Man Hunting, the Greatest Sport (1936)
 We Human Chemicals; or, The Knack of Getting Along With Everybody (1948)

References

External links

Thomas Dreier Papers at the University of South Florida

People from Durand, Wisconsin
Writers from Wisconsin
Writers from New Hampshire
Editors of Wisconsin newspapers
American male non-fiction writers
1976 deaths
1884 births
People from Carroll County, New Hampshire
People from Winchester, Massachusetts
People from St. Petersburg, Florida
20th-century American male writers